The Battle of Aanandapuram  was a land battle fought between the Sri Lankan Military, 58 Division, 53 Division and Task Force 8 and the Liberation Tigers of Tamil Eelam (LTTE) for the control of the last stronghold held by the LTTE. This battle is a part of the Northern Theater of Eelam War IV during the Sri Lankan civil war. The battle was fought in the Aanandapuram area of Puthukkudiyirippu AGA Sri Lanka.

Build up
Since the start of the northern offensive in 2008 the Sri Lankan Army had been steadily progressing on multiple fronts. As the LTTE had limited men and firepower, it was gradually withdrawing towards the North East part of the country. Finally they were confined to a small littoral strip of territory located between the A-35 highway (Paranthan-Mullaitheevu road) Nanthikadal and Chalai lagoons on one side and the Indian Ocean on the other.

More than 50,000 soldiers from five divisions and three task forces besieged the LTTE. The Tigers were trying desperately to break out of this encirclement and drive the forces back. Against this backdrop the LTTE planned to launch a massive counter-offensive against the armed forces. The idea was to conduct a carefully planned operation that would deliver a crippling blow to the security forces although the Tigers were outnumbered 50 to 1.

The battle
On 30 March LTTE launched a massive attack on SLA front line in the Puthukuduyirippu area, advancing out of the no-fire zone. LTTE advanced towards Puthukudiyirippu facing stiff resistance by Sri Lankan Army. SL Army's 53rd and 58th divisions and Task Force 8 advanced out of Puthukkudiyiruppu in a pincer movement intended to outflank the Charles Anthony regiment which held the eastward-running Puthukkudiyiruppu-Iranappaalai-Puthumaathalan road. A brigade of the 58th Division swung east and then south, while another from the 53rd, along with TF8, attacked east and then north, both pincers meeting at Pachaipullumottai junction to the rear of  Charles Anthony, cutting the footpath between Ambalaranpokkanai to Pachaipullumotti which LTTE used as a supply line. The Tigers fought fiercely to prevent the encirclement but were overwhelmed. Special Forces and Commandos set an ambush in the coconut trees east of the pocket, cutting routes of reinforcement to the LTTE trapped in Aanandapuram. A reinforced company of Tigers under Col Lawrence was sent in a convoy that attempted to reach the 2  km square pocket, but were ambushed and destroyed by special forces. Injured, Lawrence managed to escape with a few survivors. The Army moved in heavy support weapons, artillery and multiple-barrel rocket launchers. By 5 April, the battle was over. This was an extremely decisive battle in 2008–2009 Sri Lankan Army Northern offensive. LTTE lost most of its major leaders in a single battle and this was the first time such a thing had happened in its history. Its Radha Air-defence regiment was almost destroyed. 75% percent of its cadres were killed in the battle(during the breeching & direct battle)

LTTE casualties

Senior LTTE leaders killed

 Brig. Theepan (Overall commander of the LTTE northern front fighting formations)
 Bri.Viduthalai alias Amuthan alias Gaddafi (Bodyguard of LTTE leader Velupillai Prabhakaran, later, special commander of the Imran-Pandian regiment)
 Brig.Manivannan (Special Commander of the "Kittu" artillery brigade)
 Brig.Durga alias Meezhika (Special commander of Sothiya regiment)
 Brig.Vidhusha alias Yaazhini (Special commander of Maalathi regiment)
 Col.Nagesh (Deputy commander of the Jayanthan Regiment)
 Col.Gopith (Commander of the Charles Anthony Special Regiment)
 Col.Kamalini (Deputy Commander of Maalathi regiment)
 Col.Mohana (Deputy commander of Sothia regiment)
 Col.Gopal (Deputy commander of the "Kutty Sri" mortar brigade)
 Col.Amudha (Women division Chief of the "Kutty Sri" mortar brigade)
 Col.Asmi (Commander of "Ponnamman" mining unit)
 Col.Tamil Selvi alias Mathi (Commander of Malathi regiment)
 Col.Anton (Chief of LTTE Trincomalee Intelligence department(TOSIS))  
 Col.Ellalan
 Lt.Col.Saththiyappiriya alias Eekaiyoli (Commander of Women Political division Regiment)
 Lt.Col.Makeenthiram (Chief of 'Sea Resource' department)
 Lt.Col.Vaakiisan
 Lt.Col.Seralaathan (In-charge of the Tiger TV "Nitharsanam")
 Lt.Col.Meyyarivu (Imran-Pandian regiment)
 Lt.Col.Rajesh (Imran-Pandian regiment)
 Lt.Col.Akilesh (Imran-Pandian regiment)
 Lt.Col.Nalan (Special Officer of Imran-Pandian regiment)
 Lt.Col.Hindustani (Land Black Tiger)
 Lt.Col.Amuthaap (Deputy commander of the Charles Anthony special regiment)
 Lt.Col.Abdulaah
 Lt.Col.Puratchi Nilaa(Commander of Malathi regiment's commanding post)

Senior LTTE leaders killed (Ranks unknown) 
 Mahindan (Senior Sea Tiger Commander) 
 Aadithyan (Manal Aru attack commander)
 Iniyavan (Special commander of Radha air-defence regiment) 
 Maankuyil (One of the commanders of LTTE Intelligence department(TOSIS))
Other Senior leaders named Ashvini, Anjchaan, Vannam, Aaral.

Killed senior Commanders of Radha Air-defence regiment
 Col.Veengaiyan alias Aiyanaar (Commander of Radha air-defence regiment)
 Lt.Col. Anbu (Deputy commander of Radha air-defence regiment)
 Lt.Col. Anushan 
 Lt.Col. Kapilan (one of the commanders of Radha air-defence regiment)
 Lt.Col. Anthias 
 Lt.Col. Ilavarasan 
 Lt.Col. Aarraloon 
 Lt.Col. Perungkeeran 
 Lt.Col. Ezhisai
 Lt.Col. Mathivarman 
 Lt.Col. Vallavan 
 Lt.Col. Kulam 
 Lt.Col. Kannan 
 Lt.Col. Niranjan 
 Lt.Col. Thayaaparan 
 Lt.Col. Mainthen (one of the commanders of Radha air-defence regiment)
 Lt.Col. Vannam (one of the commanders of Radha air-defence regiment)

Some of these Radha regiments Commanders breached the SLA's siege on Aananthapuram from outside on the evening of 31 March and entered into the sieged Aananthapuram region to bring back their cadres who were trapped inside. But unfortunately, the siege was very tight to breach and all of these commanders along with their cadres were killed by SLA.

Alampil Landing
This was done by Ltte to break the Anandhapuram box and to safely take out their cadres. But it was failed due to the heavy Shelling of the SriLankan Army and repelled by SLA. On 04.04.2009 Senior LTTE Commander Brigadier Jayam, Attack commander of LTTE intelligence department(TOSIS) Colonel Veerathevan(Later killed in this landing) and Commander Colonel Peerinpam were handed over the task by LTTE Chief Velupillai Prabhakaran to land an eighty LTTE Cadres and their supplies from Mullivaikal to Nayarru Hill and bring the Cadres who were trapped in the Aananthapuram box to Mullivaikkal.

Accordingly, the LTTE supply teams (Fifteen Boats) were ordered to provide security for the landing teams by LTTE Admiral Soosai(Soosai, used to instruct the LTTE teams to ensure that they do not allow SL navy to cause any harm to the cadres coming through the distribution operation from any part of Tamil Eelam as they go through each distribution operation.) The Sea Tigers Sea attack teams were also deployed on the evening of 03.04.2009 to ensure that the Sri Lanka Navy did not interfere with the landing.

As more and more of their boat contingents were going, they were identified by the Sri Lankan Army and the shells were fired into the sea since they started. But despite the dangers, the distribution teams went their own way according to the tasks assigned to them. After receiving the command from the command centre, that is, on 04.04.2009 at about three o'clock in the morning, the team led by Colonel Veerathevan landed first.

As they were a small team and their fighters made inexperienced long-distance voyages, they were eventually killed in the battle where there was no cover for fighting against the Sri Lankan Army who was on the shore and getting reinforced continuously. Nearly 20-25 LTTE fighters were killed in that Landing according to the SLAs wartime report. Later Col. Veerathevan's body was recovered from the seashore by SLA.

As the attempt was unsuccessful, other fighters did not attempt to make a landing. Later they returned safely and arrived in Mullivaikkal with the help of the Sea attack teams(Nalaayini special Sea attack team and Charles special sea attack team) of Sea tigers.

See also
 2008–09 Sri Lankan Army Northern offensive
 Alleged war crimes during the Sri Lankan Civil War
 List of attacks attributed to the LTTE

References

External links
 
 
 

2008–2009 Sri Lankan Army Northern offensive
Conflicts in 2009
March 2009 events in Asia
April 2009 events in Asia